Salomon Konijn (14 January 1874, Amsterdam – 15 March 1932, Amsterdam) was a Dutch gymnast who competed in the 1908 Summer Olympics. He was part of the Dutch gymnastics team, which finished seventh in the team event.

References

External links
 

1874 births
1932 deaths
Dutch male artistic gymnasts
Gymnasts at the 1908 Summer Olympics
Olympic gymnasts of the Netherlands
Gymnasts from Amsterdam